Citrullinemia is an autosomal recessive urea cycle disorder that causes ammonia and other toxic substances to accumulate in the blood. 

Two forms of citrullinemia have been described, both having different signs and symptoms, and are caused by mutations in different genes. Citrullinemia belongs to a class of genetic diseases called urea cycle disorders. The urea cycle is a sequence of chemical reactions taking place in the liver. These reactions process excess nitrogen, generated when protein is used for energy by the body, to make urea, which is excreted by the kidneys.

Diagnosis

Type I
Type I citrullinemia (also known as classic citrullinemia) usually becomes evident in the first few days of life. Affected infants typically appear normal at birth, but as ammonia builds up in the body, they develop a lack of energy (lethargy), poor feeding, vomiting, seizures, and loss of consciousness. These medical problems can be life-threatening in many cases. A milder form of type I citrullinemia is less common in childhood or adulthood. Some people with gene mutations that cause type I citrullinemia never experience signs and symptoms of the disorder.
Investigation for diagnosis of citrullinemia type l elevated citrulline .

Type I citrullinemia is the most common form of the disorder, affecting about one in 57,000 births worldwide. Mutations in the ASS gene cause type I citrullinemia. The enzyme made by this gene, argininosuccinate synthetase, is responsible for one step of the urea cycle. Mutations in the ASS gene reduce the activity of the enzyme, which disrupts the urea cycle and prevents the body from processing nitrogen effectively. Excess nitrogen, in the form of ammonia, and other byproducts of the urea cycle, accumulate in the bloodstream, leading to the characteristic features of type I citrullinemia.

Type II
The symptoms of type II citrullinemia ( and ) usually appear during adulthood and mainly affect the central nervous system. Characteristic features include confusion, abnormal behaviors (such as aggression, irritability, and hyperactivity), seizures, and coma. Specific investigation like decrease citrulline level , increase ammonium ion . These symptoms can be life-threatening, and are known to be triggered by certain medications, infections, and alcohol intake in people with this type.

Type II citrullinemia may also develop in people who had a liver disorder called neonatal cholestasis during infancy. This condition blocks the flow of bile and prevents the body from processing certain nutrients properly. In many cases, the  symptoms resolve within a year. Years or even decades later, however, some of these people develop the characteristic features of adult type II citrullinemia.

Type II citrullinemia is primarily found in the Japanese population, where it occurs in an estimated one in 100,000 to 230,000 individuals. Type II has also been reported in people from East Asian and Middle Eastern populations. Mutations in the SLC25A13 gene are responsible for type II citrullinemia. This gene makes a protein called citrin, which normally shuttles certain molecules in and out of mitochondria. These molecules are essential for the urea cycle and are also involved in making proteins and nucleotides. Mutations in  SLC25A13 typically prevent the production of any functional citrin, which inhibits the urea cycle and disrupts the production of proteins and nucleotides. The resulting buildup of ammonia and other toxic substances leads to the symptoms of type II citrullinemia. Researchers have found many infants with neonatal intrahepatic cholestasis have the same mutations in the SLC25A13 gene as adults with type II citrullinemia.

Treatment
There are multiple treatment methods.  Low protein diets, are intended to minimize production of ammonia. Arginine, sodium benzoate and sodium phenylacetate help to remove ammonia from the blood. Dialysis may be used to remove ammonia from the blood when it reaches critical levels.
In some cases, liver transplant has been successful.

See also
 Hyperammonemia
 Citrullinemia type I

References

Further reading
  GeneReviews/NCBI/NIH/UW entry on Argininosuccinate Synthetase Deficiency; ASS Deficiency; Argininosuccinic Acid Synthetase Deficiency; CTLN1; Citrullinemia, Classic
  GeneReviews/NIH/UW entry on Citrin deficiency and Citrullinemia Type II
 The U.S. National Library of Medicine

External links

Amino acid metabolism disorders
Autosomal recessive disorders
Skin conditions resulting from errors in metabolism